Mascots is a 1929 German silent film directed by Felix Basch and starring Käthe von Nagy, Jeanne Helbling, and Muriel Angelus. It is based on an operetta by Walter Bromme and Georg Okonkowski.

The film's sets were designed by the art directors Otto Erdmann and Hans Sohnle.

Cast
Käthe von Nagy as Margot, Shop assistant
Jeanne Helbling as Elvira, Dancer
Muriel Angelus as Annie, Draftswoman
Ivan Koval-Samborsky as Paul, Actor
Kurt Vespermann as Bruno, Musician
Paul Morgan as Harry, Juggler
Mikhail Rasumny as Max, Painter
Max Gülstorff as Theatre Director Kugel
Hans Albers as Antoine, Rayonchef
Jakob Tiedtke as Director Lieblich
Hermann Picha as Civil servant
Paul Westermeier as Portier

References

External links

Films of the Weimar Republic
Films directed by Felix Basch
German silent feature films
Films based on operettas
German black-and-white films